Tarsem Singh Purewal (10 June 1934 – 24 January 1995) was an Indian editor for Des Pardes, a Punjabi-language weekly in Gurmukhi script, published in London, UK and aimed at the  local Indian community.  Purewal was shot and killed, case remains unsolved.

Career 
Tarsem Singh Purewal was a writer and editor the Des Pardes which is Britain's largest circulation Punjabi language newspaper. He supported his Sikh homeland but, was critical of the tactics employed by the Sikh government.

Death 
Tarsem Singh Purewal was 61 years old when he was shot and killed at point-blank range, by unknown attackers, on the street outside his London Office on 24 January 1995. Purewal was a possible witness in the Air India trial but was gunned down before the trial.  He had also published articles accusing Jasbir Singh Rode, who was general secretary of the International Sikh Youth Federation, of stealing public funds.

Context 
Although the shooting of Purewal happened on a busy London street, few people claimed to have seen anything and the killing had many of the characteristics of a professional hit by an assassin.

Purewal's death remains unsolved. Also unsolved is the murder case of Purewal's close friend and fellow journalist Tara Singh Hayer, a journalist from Vancouver, Canada, who had been left in a wheelchair after one murder attempt, but was murdered in 1998.

Several fellow journalists and members of the Sikh community believe the writing duo were killed because they knew too much information about the Air India bomb plot.

Another theory on Purewal's death was that he was murdered by a family member of one of the rape victims he was revealing information about in his copies of Des Pardes. Copies are being translated into English as one avenue of inquiry concerns reports that Purewal may have upset Sikh community members by publishing the names of rape victims, their assailants, and adulterers. He both owned and edited the paper, which he started in 1965.

Police sources said the rape reports were thought to have been based on court cases. But, because the newspaper was in Punjabi, legal authorities had no idea that the newspaper had published information in contempt by breach of court rules. "It's believed that Mr Purewal had named rape victims and rapists.

Impact 
Raghbir Singh was arrested on 29 March 1995, facing deportation from the UK.

See also 
 Tara Singh Hayer, journalist, murdered 1998 in Canada
 Air India Flight 182#Murdered witnesses, a 1985 airliner bombing
 Khalistan movement#Support from outside India

References

External links 
 The Journalists' Memorial - Tarsem Singh Purewal

1930s births
Indian people murdered abroad
People murdered in London
Indian newspaper editors
1995 deaths
1990s murders in London